The following is a partial list of Lithuanian composers.

A
 Kęstutis Antanėlis

B
 Vytautas Bacevičius
 Osvaldas Balakauskas
 Vytautas Barkauskas
 Vidmantas Bartulis

C
 Mikalojus Konstantinas Čiurlionis

D
 Balys Dvarionas

G
 Nailia Galiamova
 Gediminas Gelgotas
 Juozas Gruodis

K
 Bronius Kutavičius

See also 
 List of Lithuanians

Lithuanian
Composers